Live at La Zona Rosa 3.19.04 is a live album released by Sparta. The album has since been out of print. Only 1000 copies were made.

There is also a live EP released by the band Coheed and Cambria named Live at La Zona Rosa, recorded on the same date when the two bands played together.

Track listing
"Intro" - 0:22
"Cut Your Ribbon" - 3:07
"Mye" - 3:51
"La Cerca" - 4:44
"Light Burns Clear" - 4:26
"Lines in Sand" - 5:53
"Assemble the Empire" - 3:51

Personnel

Sparta
Jim Ward: Guitar and Vocals
Paul Hinojos: Guitar, Backing Vocals
Matt Miller: Bass guitar
Tony Hajjar: Drums

Management
Blaze James @ Black Sheep Fellowship

A&R
Ron Handler @ DreamWorks/Geffen

Booking
Don Muller @ CAA

Legal
Ian Montone and Scott Bradford @ Davis, Shapiro. Lewit, Montone and Hayes

Road Crew
Gabe Kerbrat: Tour Manager
Adam Wakeling: Sound
Jeff "Rhino" Neuman: Stage Tech

The Burning Van
Chuck E. Myers: Producer
Nicholas Terry: Producer
Brain Vaughn: Engineer
Tino Saiki: Assistant Engineer
Matt Winegar: Remote Truck Engineering

Additional Remote Recording Services By
Ray Kimbler
Kimber Kable
IsoMike
Ryan Smith
SHURE Microphones
Hazmat
FOH Engineer La Zona Rosa
Jeff
J Squard Services
Tim Kennard
Forrest Production Services
Tequilla Mockingbird Studios
Joel Stevenett
Drummer.2.The.Starz.Backline

Sparta (band) albums
Geffen Records live albums